Mustafa Jabbar (born 12 August 1949) is a Bangladeshi businessman, technology entrepreneur and the current Minister of Post and Telecommunication in the Government of Bangladesh. He also served as the president of Bangladesh Association of Software and Information Services (BASIS). He is best known for the creation of Bijoy Bengali keyboard, which was developed in 1988, and it was most widely used Bengali input method until the release of Unicode based Avro Keyboard. He served as the president of Bangladesh Computer Samity, the national ICT organisation of Bangladesh for four consecutive periods. He is a champion of Bangla Bhasha Procholon Ain, 1987 (বাংলা ভাষা প্রচলন আইন, ১৯৮৭; Bengali Language Implementation Act, 1987), and has been praised for promoting the Bengali language in the digital media.

Early life and education
Jabbar's ancestral home is in Krishnapur village, Khaliajuri Upazila in Netrokona district. He was born on Ashuganj Upazila in Brahmanbaria District to Abdul Jabbar Talukdar and Rabeya Khatun. Jabbar passed his HSC examination from Dhaka College. In 1968, he enrolled in the Department of Bangla at the University of Dhaka and completed his BA in 1972 and MA in journalism in 1974.

Career
Jabbar started his career as a journalist in 1972 for Daily Ganakantha until it's shut down in 1975. In 1973, he was elected as the publicity secretary of the Dhaka Union of Journalists. He got involved in the businesses of travel agency, printing and publication. He had served as the general secretary of the Association of Travel Agents of Bangladesh (ATAB). 

Jabbar is a founder member of the Bangladesh Computer Samity (BCS) and its four-time president. He also anchored television shows on IT. Jabbar founded Ananda Computers, best known for falsely claiming the Bangla keyboard Bijoy invented by Pappana. He heads the Bangladesh Association of Software and Information Services — the trade body of IT entrepreneurs in Bangladesh. 

Jabbar started a venture involving computers and IT in 1987 and launched the Bijoy Bangla Keyboard and Software on 16 December 1988. He has developed Bijoy Library, a library management Software which is being used by libraries of Bangladesh including British Council. He has developed a software named Bijoy Shishu Shiksha for pre-school kids. He developed Prathomik Computer Shiksha, based on textbooks published by National Curriculum and Textbook Board (NCTB). He established schools in Bangladesh including computer-based Ananda Multimedia School and Bijoy Digital School. 

He is involved in writing textbooks on computer in Bangla and English. Jabbar sat on several government committees on ICT affairs, including the prime minister–formed Digital Bangladesh Taskforce. He is also a member of the Bangladesh Copyright Board. He was appointed as the Minister of Posts, Telecommunications and Information Technology of the Government of Bangladesh on 3 January 2018.

Jabbar was a member of Mujib Bahini (Bangladesh Liberation Force) in 1971 and participated in the Liberation War of Bangladesh. He was involved in the movement of freedom of the press and was actively associated with the Dhaka Union of Journalists. He was elected as the Organising Secretary of Dhaka Union of Journalists (DUJ).

Mustafa Jabbar has been praised for popularizing the use of the Bengali language in computer and other digital media. A champion of Bangla Bhasha Procholon Ain, 1987, Jabbar opines that until and unless Bengali is well-established as a language of verdict in the Supreme Court of Bangladesh and as the language of research in Bangladeshi universities, Bengali language movement cannot be called finished.

Mustafa Jabbar is also known for going after popular opensource Bengali keyboard software Avro. Later, they settled after Avro removed the alleged layout from their software. The whole affair was widely discussed in Bengali blog forums with most people supporting Avro.

Jabbar's recent decisions as minister of Post and Telecommunication, such as censorship, social site monitoring and blocking of PUBG, Reddit along with popular web services like Bitly URL shortener, issuu.com, medium.com, cloud file sharing website mediafire.com, Change.org, Russian social media website VK, Imgur, Opera (web browser) and Internet Archive created a large group of critics and angered the young generation of Bangladesh. His ministry also blocked a webpage containing complaints against the government's student wing- BCL without any reason. As Minister he made it mandatory for all phones manufactured and imported in Bangladesh must have his software, Bijoy app, preinstalled.

References

1949 births
Living people
People from Khaliajuri Upazila
Dhaka College alumni
University of Dhaka alumni
Bangladeshi businesspeople
Posts, Telecommunications and Information Technology ministers
People from Ashuganj Upazila